The phrase "thoughts and prayers" is often used by officials and celebrities in the United States as a condolence after a tragic event, such as a deadly natural disaster or mass shooting.  The phrase has received criticism for its repeated usage in the context of gun violence or terrorism, with critics claiming "thoughts and prayers" are offered as substitutes for action such as gun control or counter-terrorism.

Usage history

The phrase thoughts and prayers is frequently used in the United States as an expression of condolences for victims of natural disasters (e.g. Hurricane Katrina in 2005, the 2010 Canterbury earthquake 2011 Christchurch earthquake, the 2017 Central Mexico earthquake, and Hurricane Maria in 2017). In addition, "thoughts and prayers" are also offered to victims of numerous mass shootings, including the Columbine High School massacre (1999), the November 2015 Paris attacks, the Orlando nightclub shooting, and the 2017 Las Vegas shooting.

Former American President Donald Trump has been known to use the phrase. In 2016, he used it following the St. Joseph courthouse shooting, the Great Smoky Mountains wildfires, and the shooting of Nykea Aldridge, cousin of professional basketball player Dwyane Wade. In 2017 he used it following the Congressional baseball shooting in June and the Southern California wildfires in December. In 2018, Trump used the phrase following the 2018 Marshall County High School shooting in January, the Carcassonne and Trèbes attack in March, the YouTube headquarters shooting in April, and the Capital Gazette shooting in June.

Following the Stoneman Douglas High School shooting in February 2018, Slate noted that several Republican politicians who had previously used the idiom (including Trump and senators Marco Rubio and Pat Toomey) avoided using the specific phrase "thoughts and prayers" in response to the shooting. Trump, for example, instead offered "prayers and condolences" via Twitter.

Scott Morrison, the Prime Minister of Australia, offered his thoughts and prayers to the victims of the 2019 Australian bushfires in November 2019, for which Morrison was criticized and compared to American politicians who repeated similar phrases in lieu of gun ownership reforms.

Views
After a natural or human-caused disaster, people may be urged to "go beyond thoughts and prayers", by donating blood or sending aid or money to help the victims. After the Las Vegas shooting, authorities said that although thoughts and prayers are appreciated, the most effective way to help was to give blood. Academic studies have been performed on whether an act of token support leads to sustained contributions; the concept of moral self-licensing, in which prior good deeds can empower individuals to subsequently behave badly, or conversely, whether prior immoral actions can lead to compensatory moral actions has also been cited as a factor in the use of "thoughts and prayers" in lieu of action.

Criticism
As "thoughts and prayers" became associated with post-tragedy condolences, many have criticized the phrase as a form of slacktivism. Jonathan Foiles, writing in Psychology Today, compared the phrase to an infantile response and explained that Thoughts and prayers' is the linguistic equivalent of yelling for something to be different when you have the ability to effect that change yourself".

After the 2007 Virginia Tech shooting, Katrina vanden Heuvel, editor of The Nation, called on politicians to "move beyond thoughts and prayers". In her post, vanden Heuvel referred to a press release by Paul Helmke, then-president of the Brady Campaign, who offered his thoughts and prayers but also stated "it is long overdue for us to take some common-sense actions to prevent tragedies like this from continuing to occur."

In October 2015, following the Umpqua Community College shooting, President Obama said that "thoughts and prayers [do] not capture the heartache and grief and anger that we should feel, and it does nothing to prevent this carnage from being inflicted some place else in America next week or a couple months from now." The White House subsequently announced that Obama would continue to take more executive action on the subject of gun control.

On December 2, 2015, in the wake of the San Bernardino mass shooting, Senator Chris Murphy (D-CT) tweeted his frustration with the phrase "thoughts and prayers", a sentiment echoed by the December 3 cover of the New York Daily News, which included tweets from senators and representatives the newspaper characterized as "meaningless platitudes".

After the Stoneman Douglas High School shooting in February 2018, demands for "policy and change" were used as a pithy rejoinder to the typical "thoughts and prayers" offered by politicians. Student survivors of the shooting were joined by religious leaders in calling for concrete legislative actions.

By August 2019, as reported by the Gun Violence Archive, there were 251 mass shootings in the United States only 216 days into the year. Robin Lloyd, managing director of the nonprofit Giffords, stated "The days when politicians can get away with offering thoughts and prayers are over. The public knows thoughts and prayers won't prevent the next tragedy." Lloyd called upon Senate Majority Leader Mitch McConnell to take action on gun control legislation passed by the House but not heard in the Senate.

After the 2022 Buffalo shooting, New Jersey governor Phil Murphy called for stricter federal and state gun laws.  He criticized gun control opponents and conspiracy theorists, saying "I think every single one of them knows where they can shove their 'thoughts and prayers.

Shortly after the 2023 Michigan State University shooting Michigan House of Representatives member Ranjeev Puri released a statement which included the phrase "Fuck your thoughts and prayers."

Religious criticism
Some critics of the phrase "thoughts and prayers" point to the Christian New Testament to argue that action is needed in addition to expressions of faith. One verse cited to back up this argument is James 2:14–16: "What good is it, my brothers, if someone says he has faith but does not have works? Can that faith save him? If a brother or sister is poorly clothed and lacking in daily food, and one of you says to them, "Go in peace, be warmed and filled," without giving them the things needed for the body, what good is that?" Pope Francis stated that "prayer that doesn't lead to concrete action toward our brothers is a fruitless and incomplete prayer.... Prayer and action must always be profoundly united" in his Sunday Angelus message on July 21, 2013.

Pastors Josh Buice and John Rasmussen have taken issue with the public declaration of prayer, calling it an "obligatory public lament" instead of an expression of genuine concern. According to Matthew 6:5: "And when you pray, you must not be like the hypocrites. For they love to stand and pray in the synagogues and at the street corners, that they may be seen by others. Truly, I say to you, they have received their reward."

Defense
Laura Coward, a writer for The Huffington Post, defended the use of the phrase "thoughts and prayers", acknowledging the inadequacy of not taking actions, but arguing that prayer "jolts us and disrupts us, removing us from our comfort zones[... it] takes us to uncomfortable places – spiritually, physically and emotionally – and asks us to do the hard work of accepting more than one perspective."

The criticism of the phrase "thoughts and prayers" has itself received criticism as insensitive to those who sincerely pray for victims. Katelyn Beaty argued that prayer "is perhaps the most powerful form of action you can engage in during a crisis", citing studies which showed that regular meditation and prayer improved focus and reduced anxiety, touting the potential beneficial effects for "better policy solutions than would an urgent, fretful, ill-considered response".

In 2019, following a weekend in which mass shootings occurred in El Paso, Texas, and Dayton, Ohio, former Arkansas governor Mike Huckabee suggested that, of the continued occurrence of mass shootings, "the lack of thought and prayers is probably the single biggest factor in what is behind them".

Distraction using "now is not the time"
The ineffectiveness of "thoughts and prayers" can be a deliberate choice. President Obama stated in October 2015 that "to actively do nothing is a [political] decision as well."

In many instances, the same people who offer "thoughts and prayers" also criticize proposed reforms as being too quick to politicize a tragedy. Like the propaganda technique of whataboutism, criticizing potential reforms as being too political can distract politicians from taking direct action by effectively pointing towards unlikely or fringe reasons for the tragedy; for example, advocating for mental health reform or Islamic terrorism prevention in lieu of passing gun control laws.

Gun politics in the United States

The momentum for gun control legislation in the United States has been blunted repeatedly by the use of the phrase "now is not the time", offered as a defense against what could potentially be hastily-drafted laws. David Weigel pointed out that repeated calls to wait for an "appropriate time" to discuss gun control is the strategy used by the National Rifle Association (NRA) to avoid meaningful legislative action. The BBC called "the enthusiasm gap" the "single biggest obstacle to new gun-control laws" in the United States: "Pro-gun politicians offer their thoughts and prayers, observe moments of silence and order flags flown half-staff. Then, in the quiet, legislative efforts are deferred and ultimately derailed."

Following the December 2012 Sandy Hook Elementary School shooting, several politicians used the phrase "thoughts and prayers" in place of taking immediate legislative action. President Barack Obama called for "meaningful action to prevent more tragedies like this regardless of the politics", and New York mayor Michael Bloomberg challenged him to go further: "the country needs [Obama] to send a bill to Congress to fix this problem – and take immediate executive action. Calling for 'meaningful action' is not enough. We have heard that rhetoric before. What we have not seen is leadership – not from the President and not from Congress. That must end today. This is a national tragedy and it demands a national response." The resulting proposed federal legislation to control guns, including universal background checks, failed to pass Congress; after the bipartisan Manchin-Toomey amendment failed on April 17, 2013, Obama called it "a pretty shameful day for Washington".

Following the Orlando nightclub shooting in June 2016, astronomer and skeptic Phil Plait wrote that while it was "natural and very human" to "send their thoughts and express their grief... it's cynically hypocritical when politicians do it ", later noting it was "particularly galling" to see "all the NRA-funded lawmakers tweeting their 'thoughts and prayers. An accompanying Slate post provided a selected list of members of Congress who had tweeted "thoughts and prayers" along with the amount of campaign contributions they had received from gun rights groups, based on research provided by Igor Volsky of the Center for American Progress. NRA donations to politicians who expressed "thoughts and prayers" in lieu of meaningful gun control legislation were again publicized after the Las Vegas shootings in October 2017 and the Stoneman Douglas shooting in February 2018.

After the Stoneman Douglas High School shooting, Florida state senators held a contentious debate on SB 7026, which included funding for mental health programs and authorized teachers and school officials to carry concealed firearms; among the amendments that failed were a ban on assault weapons, large-capacity magazines, a gun registry, and requiring background checks for guns purchased out-of-state. Opponents of the ban on assault weapons included Sen. David H. Simmons, who drew an analogy to Nazi Germany's ban on private ownership of firearms, and Sen. Kelli Stargel, who questioned whether the ban would be extended to fertilizer (used in the Oklahoma City bombing) and pressure cookers (used in the Boston Marathon bombing). Stargel added "When we say 'thoughts and prayers,' it's frowned upon. And I take real offense at that because thoughts and prayers are really the only thing that’s gonna stop the evil from within the individual who is taking up their arms to do this kind of a massacre."

Following the November 2019 Saugus High School shooting, Saugus alumnus and former Representative Katie Hill released a statement saying her "thoughts and prayers are with the victims and families in my community today". Her statement also singled out Senator Mitch McConnell, saying he believed "it is more important to protect the NRA and the money he receives than it is to protect our kids" as McConnell has refused to advance four separate gun control bills that had passed the House but were not taken up by the Senate. Senator Chris Murphy moved to pass the universal background checks bill the same day the shootings had occurred, but the motion was blocked by Senator Cindy Hyde-Smith; both senators learned about the shooting after Hyde-Smith had blocked the bill. Vice President Mike Pence, in California for a tour of NASA Ames, expressed support for the Saugus High School community, conveying the hearts and prayers "of every American", adding "This president and this administration will remain resolved to bring the scourge of mass shootings to an end. And we will not rest or relent until we end this evil in our time and make our schools and communities safe again", which was received with skepticism on social media. Earlier that year, Pence had promised that "Under this President and this Vice President, no one is taking your guns. Under this President and this administration, the right to keep and bear arms shall not be infringed" in an April speech before the NRA convention, held in Indianapolis.

Gun control response in other countries
After the Christchurch mosque shootings in 2019, prominent international figures offered their thoughts and prayers, including Queen Elizabeth II, Prime Minister of Pakistan Imran Khan, Pope Francis, and President of the Republic of China Tsai Ing-wen. New Zealand legislators responded by passing a law banning the ownership of most semi-automatic weapons aside from pistols under limited circumstances. The response in New Zealand was singled out as a counterexample to "the same old tired script: one politician after another condemning the attack and offering thoughts and prayers to the victims and families. But something different happened. Instead of offering thoughts and prayers, New Zealand's Prime Minister Jacinda Ardern promised action". New Zealand had previously had less restrictions on gun ownership than many other Western countries. Social media posts were made mocking the effectiveness of "thoughts and prayers", comparing the rapid passage of gun control legislation in New Zealand with the repeated failure of United States gun control laws.

In many other Western countries, stricter gun control laws have been passed in response to gun violence. Besides New Zealand, new gun control laws were introduced in the United Kingdom (after the Hungerford massacre in 1987, and again after the Dunblane massacre in 1996), Australia (the National Firearms Agreement, following the Port Arthur massacre of April 1996), Germany (after shootings in Erfurt in 2002 and Winnenden in 2009), and Norway (a belated response to the 2011 Norway attacks). The sustained grassroots campaign that resulted in a ban of all handguns in the UK following the Dunblane massacre of 1996 was contrasted with American inaction in 2018 by a Dunblane resident: "I wouldn't want thoughts and prayers, I would want policies and regulation and a grown-up discussion about changing the American gun culture."

Climate change

In the wake of the February 2009 Black Saturday bushfires, PM Kevin Rudd sent his "thoughts and prayers" to those affected; a royal commission was set up to investigate the cause and response. The Climate Institute of Australia and the United Firefighters Union of Australia concluded that climate change had caused the extreme forest fire danger index leading up to Black Saturday and may have contributed to earlier bushfires dating back to 2001.

During the disastrous 2019–20 Australian bushfire season, PM Morrison and other government officials extended their "thoughts and prayers" to the victims; the phrase was criticized for how it was used to deflect attention away from how climate change and government policy may have affected the duration and intensity of the fire season. Also, PM Morrison was singled out for failing to provide support to fire victims. Earlier, in October 2019 PM Morrison had announced he would work to stymie protesters and activists from discouraging businesses from working with the coal mining industry. After the fires prompted him to cut short a vacation to Hawaii in late December, PM Morrison stated he had "always acknowledged the connection between these weather events and these broader fire events and the impact globally of climate change" and defended the government's actions to mitigate climate change, saying "we'll do it without economy wrecking or job destroying. We'll do it with sensible targets that get the balance right."

Deputy PM Michael McCormack dismissed the link between climate change and the bushfires as "ravings of some pure, enlightened and woke capital-city greenies", despite the federal National Disaster Risk Reduction Framework report, published in 2018, explicitly tying climate change to natural disasters: "Many natural hazards are becoming more frequent and more intense, driven by Australia's changing climate.... There is growing potential for cumulative or concurrent, large-scale natural hazards to occur." In addition, the State of the Climate 2018 report warned "There has been an associated increase in the length of the fire weather season. Climate change, including increasing temperatures, is contributing to these changes," and added "The drying in recent decades across southern Australia is the most sustained
large-scale change in rainfall since national records began in 1900." Adam Bandt called DPM McCormack "a dangerous fool" and added "[t]houghts and prayers are not enough, we need science and action too" in calling for a change in government policy. David Littleproud, Minister for Agriculture and Water Resources, stated he did not "want to weaponise [climate change policy] in the middle of someone's misery", stating it was "not the time" to discuss the government's policy. Deputy Premier of New South Wales John Barilaro called those who would link climate change to the bushfires a "bloody disgrace" for politicising the tragedy.

Cumulatively, the comments brought forward theories that Australian Greens policies were partially responsible for the intensity of the bushfires by stopping hazard reduction efforts and shifted the debate from the effect of climate change to whether a debate about climate change was appropriate. Although hazard reduction policies have been criticized after previous catastrophic bushfires, the claims that Greens policies have prevented backburning were called "very tired and very old conspiracy theories... an obvious attempt to deflect the conversation away from climate change" by Professor Ross Bradstock; the hotter conditions leading to elevated forest fire danger indices for a longer time period instead were blamed for reduced preventative burning.

After an estimated 20,000 marched in December 2019 through the smoky streets of Sydney to protest the government's inaction on climate change, DPM McCormack acknowledged that climate change was "a factor" in the bushfires but added "it is important to note that most of these fires have been caused by 'Little Lucifers, alluding to the possibility of arson. Arsonists have been responsible for bushfires in the past, and it was estimated that up to half of all bushfires are the result of arson or suspected arson per year. However, arson is suspected to have caused a small minority of the bushfires in the 2019–20 season.

In culture

Visual media
In his 2015 stand up special Thoughts and Prayers, comedian Anthony Jeselnik skewers people who tweet out "thoughts and prayers" on the day of a tragedy, calling it a way for those people to garner attention in the face of a tragedy and saying that tweeting thoughts and prayers is so useless that it achieves "less than nothing".

In 2016, a web-based video game, Thoughts and Prayers: The Game, was published to argue that thoughts and prayers have had no effect on saving lives in the context of mass shootings.

The fifth episode of the fourth season of animated series BoJack Horseman, titled "Thoughts and Prayers", presents a real-life shooting that delays the opening of a new movie featuring gun violence.

Ironic sympathy for the NRA
In early August 2018, after court documents were made public showing the National Rifle Association was having financial issues, satirical tweets were made offering thoughts and prayers for the NRA's troubles. Thoughts and prayers were again directed to the NRA in November 2018 after news broke that free coffee at the headquarters was being discontinued amid a sharp drop in revenue and again in December 2018 after suspected spy Maria Butina pleaded guilty to using her connections with the NRA as a way to infiltrate American conservative groups.

After the state of New York announced it would investigate the tax-exempt status of the NRA in April 2019, Governor Andrew Cuomo announced he would remember the organization in his thoughts and prayers. In June 2019, after the NRA discontinued live programming that had been carried on NRATV, "thoughts and prayers" were sent via social media.

In August 2020, New York Attorney General Letitia James filed a lawsuit against the NRA, seeking to dissolve it for illegal conduct. The NRA is registered in the state of New York as a 501(c)(4) non-profit corporation, and the suit charges the NRA and four named defendants with failure to fulfill their fiduciary duty, resulting in a loss of $64 million in three years. The March for Our Lives organization responded by sarcastically offering 'thoughts and prayers' to the NRA via Twitter.

In music
A song entitled "Thoughts and Prayers" appears on the 2018 album My American Dream by singer-songwriter Will Hoge, who wrote it after the Sutherland Springs church shooting. Hoge told Rolling Stone writer Jonathan Bernstein "I know that phrase can be a kind and thoughtful way to express sympathy when there is no other way to help, but after these shootings, using that stock response from these cowards on Capitol Hill is incredibly insulting. They have all the opportunities in the world to make a difference, but they do nothing. Then to just send out a phrase like 'thoughts and prayers,' as if we don’t all know that there is something they could do? It's shameful."

After the Stoneman Douglas shooting in Parkland, Florida, Canadian-American musician grandson wrote and released the song "thoughts & prayers" on March 23, 2018, which also criticizes politicians who resist "any attempt at meaningful gun reform".

The heavy metal band Motionless in White released a song entitled "Thoughts & Prayers" on June 2, 2019, the first single from their album Disguise. According to Chris "Motionless" Cerulli, "It's my commentary on the very evil ways that [religion is] used".

The Raconteurs also released their album Help Us Stranger in June 2019; the closing track is entitled "Thoughts and Prayers". When asked about that song, Jack White stated "That phrase has become meaningless. It's a thoughtless phrase. Basically an insult."

The punk group Good Riddance released an album entitled Thoughts and Prayers in August 2019. According to Russ Rankin, "I'm sick of hearing that [phrase], especially when there's a mass shooting in New Zealand and the nation takes steps to outlaw semi-automatic weapons in the same week. Meanwhile, here in America, we're dealing with hundreds and hundreds of mass shootings and not doing anything about it."

The Drive-By Truckers publicized their song "Thoughts and Prayers" from the studio album The Unraveling in January 2020. In his review of the album for Rolling Stone, Jonathan Bernstein characterizes the song as taking aim at the phrase he called "phony right-wing piety".

Filter released "Thoughts and Prayers" ahead of their album Murica in June 2020. Vocalist Richard Patrick called for action in lieu of the phrase: Thoughts and Prayers' has become a meaningless catchphrase that gets thrown out every time something bad happens. Usually a mass murder etc. It's an empty gesture. It's time for more than thoughts and prayers."

See also
List of attacks related to secondary schools
List of rampage killers (school massacres)
Prayer healing and faith healing—more general discussions on effectiveness or lack thereof
School shootings in the United States
List of mass shootings in the United States

References

External links

 
 

Grief
Gun violence
Political neologisms
Political terminology of the United States
Prayer
Terrorism
Articles containing video clips